Northern Ireland has competed in nineteen of the twenty-one Commonwealth Games beginning with the second games, held in 1934. Northern Ireland did not compete in 1930 (when there was a single team from Ireland) and in 1950.  It differs from the Olympic Games where although it officially competes with England, Scotland and Wales as part of Great Britain and Northern Ireland, many athletes have represented the Ireland team.

Northern Ireland's participation in the Commonwealth Games is managed by the Northern Ireland Commonwealth Games Council.

Medal tally

Medals by Games

Flag and victory anthem
At the games the Northern Ireland team uses the flag of the former Government of Northern Ireland, the Ulster Banner, as its national flag. This flag is also used by the Northern Ireland national football team.

The team uses "Londonderry Air" as its victory anthem.

The team logo, and of the Commonwealth Games Council for Northern Ireland, features a stylised version of the Red Hand of Ulster, a traditional emblem of the province of Ulster of which Northern Ireland is a part.

The team goes by the abbreviation NIR.

See also

Ireland at the Commonwealth Games

References

External links
 Northern Ireland Commonwealth Games Council
 Sport Northern Ireland

 
Nations at the Commonwealth Games